John Lebans is a former politician in the province of New Brunswick, Canada He was elected to the Legislative Assembly of New Brunswick in a February 15, 1993 by-election to replace Michael McKee, who was appointed to a judgeship. Lebans chose not to run for re-election and resigned on June 26, 1995 just before the 1995 election.

He represented the electoral district of Moncton North.

References 

Living people
Canadian accountants
New Brunswick Liberal Association MLAs
People from Moncton
20th-century Canadian politicians
Year of birth missing (living people)